These are the National Natural Landmarks in the U.S. state of Hawaii.

External links
National Natural Landmarks in Hawaii on National Park Service web site

Hawaii
National Natural Landmarks